Guangyun Temple, also known as Xuetang Temple, is a Buddhist temple located in the Cangyuan Va Autonomous County of Yunnan, China.

History
Guangyun Temple was first built in 1828 by the Yunnan government, in the Daoguang period (1821–1850) in the Qing dynasty (1644–1911), it is influenced by the architectural style of Han Chinese buildings and at the same time preserves the basic form of the Theravada Buddhist temples.

On January 13, 1988, the temple was listed among the "Major National Historical and Cultural Sites" by the State Council of China.

Architecture
Guangyun Temple has three existing buildings, includes the main hall and two gates.

Main Hall
The pillars before the door are engraved with two vivid wooden Chinese dragons in sore straits. The doors and windows of the main hall are carved with openwork patterns, which show proficient skills. Inner walls are painted with 10 frescos, mostly of which are colored after outlined by ink. The styles and techniques are similar with that in the central plain areas in the Ming (1368–1644) and Qing dynasties (1644–1911). Belonging to Han Chinese architectural styles, the buildings of paintings are double eaves hip and gable roof with human figures of officials, women, soldiers, attendants and others from different ethnic groups.

See also
 List of Major National Historical and Cultural Sites in Yunnan

References

Buildings and structures in Lincang
Buddhist temples in Yunnan
Tourist attractions in Lincang
Major National Historical and Cultural Sites in Yunnan
1828 establishments in China
19th-century Buddhist temples
Religious buildings and structures completed in 1828